Mihkel Ainsalu (born 8 March 1996) is an Estonian professional footballer who plays as a midfielder for Meistriliiga club FCI Levadia.

Club career
On 24 January 2023, Ainsalu's contract with Telstar was terminated by mutual consent, and he rejoined Levadia.

International career
Ainsalu made his senior international debut for Estonia on 23 November 2017 in a 1–0 away win over Vanuatu in a friendly.

Honours

Club
Nõmme Kalju II
Esiliiga B: 2013

Flora
Meistriliiga: 2015, 2017, 2019
Estonian Cup: 2015–16
Estonian Supercup: 2016

References

External links

1996 births
Living people
Sportspeople from Tartu
Estonian footballers
Estonian expatriate footballers
Association football midfielders
Esiliiga players
Meistriliiga players
Ukrainian Premier League players
Danish 1st Division players
Eerste Divisie players
Nõmme Kalju FC players
FC Flora players
FC Lviv players
FC Helsingør players
SC Telstar players
Estonia youth international footballers
Estonia under-21 international footballers
Estonia international footballers
Expatriate footballers in Ukraine
Estonian expatriate sportspeople in Ukraine
Expatriate men's footballers in Denmark
Estonian expatriate sportspeople in Denmark
Expatriate footballers in the Netherlands
Estonian expatriate sportspeople in the Netherlands